Otrozhki is a rural locality (a khutor) and the administrative center of Otrozhkinskoye Rural Settlement, Serafimovichsky District, Volgograd Oblast, Russia. The population was 543 as of 2010. There are 12 streets.

Geography 
Otrozhki is located 85 km east of Serafimovich (the district's administrative centre) by road. Prilipkinsky is the nearest rural locality.

References 

Rural localities in Serafimovichsky District